Yeah, I Know It's a Drag... But Wastin' Pigs Is Still Radical is an EP by The Flaming Lips, released on Warner Bros. Records in 1991.

Track listing

References

1991 EPs
The Flaming Lips EPs
Warner Records EPs